Frederick Bott Lewis Jr. (January 6, 1921 – December 27, 1994) was an American professional basketball player and coach. He was the head  basketball coach at Syracuse University from 1962 to 1968. He compiled a 91-57 (.615) record during his tenure. He took his team to the National Invitation Tournament two years after the team finished the season with a record of 2-22. Prior to coaching at Syracuse, he coached at Southern Mississippi University, where he compiled an 89-38 record. He coached at Amityville High School, where he compiled a 63-40 record from 1950 to 1953.

One of his teams almost became the first team in NCAA history to average 100 or more points per game. Lewis's 1965-66 team, led by Dave Bing, participated in the NCAA Tournament and won against Davidson College in the first round before Syracuse lost to Duke University. He was replaced by Roy Danforth. He died in Sacramento, California, in 1994.

BAA/NBA career statistics

Regular season

Playoffs

References

External links

Fred Lewis' profile

1921 births
1994 deaths
American men's basketball coaches
American men's basketball players
Baltimore Bullets (1944–1954) players
Basketball players from New York City
Basketball coaches from New York (state)
Eastern Kentucky Colonels men's basketball players
Forwards (basketball)
Guards (basketball)
Hawaii Rainbow Warriors basketball coaches
High school basketball coaches in the United States
LIU Brooklyn Blackbirds men's basketball players
Philadelphia Warriors players
Sacramento State Hornets men's basketball coaches
Sheboygan Red Skins players
Southern Miss Golden Eagles basketball coaches
Sportspeople from Brooklyn
Syracuse Orange men's basketball coaches
Washington Capitols players